The Meherrin River is a  long 6th order tributary to the Chowan River that joins in Hertford County, North Carolina.

A twenty-foot-high dam on the river creates a reservoir in Emporia. For most of its length, the Meherrin is not large enough for commercial traffic.  It widens somewhat between Murfreesboro, North Carolina and the Chowan. Prior to the American Civil War, this section of the river was a significant trading route for Northeastern North Carolina.

The river was named after the Meherrin Indians, whose territory was along it.

Variant names
According to the Geographic Names Information System, it has also been known historically as:
Maherine River
Maherrin River
Mehearin River
Meherin River
Pochike River
Wayanock
Woodford River

Course
The Meherrin River is formed at the confluence of the South Meherrin River and North Meherrin River at Reekes Mill, Virginia, and then flows southeasterly into North Carolina to join the Chowan River about 0.5 miles north of Chowan Beach in Hertford County, North Carolina.

Watershed
The Meherrin River drains  of area, receives about 46.3 in/year of precipitation, has a wetness index of 495.22, and is about 46% forested.

See also
List of rivers of Virginia

References

Rivers of North Carolina
Rivers of Virginia
Rivers of Southampton County, Virginia
Bodies of water of Greensville County, Virginia
Bodies of water of Hertford County, North Carolina
Tributaries of Albemarle Sound